African American Californians, or Black Californians are residents of the state of California who are of African ancestry. According to 2019 United States Census Bureau estimates, those identified solely as African American or black constituted 5.8% or 2,282,144 residents in California. Including an additional 1.2% who identified as having partial African ancestry, the figure was 7.0% (2.8 million residents). As of 2021, California has the largest multiracial African American population by number in the United States. 

The Black community is prevalent in Alameda, Contra Costa, San Francisco, and Solano Counties in the San Francisco Bay Area, Sacramento County, and San Joaquin County. In Southern California, the population is concentrated in Los Angeles County, San Bernardino County, and San Diego County.

California also has a growing Afro-Caribbean and Sub Saharan African population to the United States. Most Sub Saharan Africans in California come from Ethiopia and Eritrea. Many Ethiopians live in Little Ethiopia in West Los Angeles. California has one of the highest concentrations of black Sub Saharan Africans. 41,249 Afro-Asians live in California. There is a Blaxican community in California. There is also a growing Blaxican population in Los Angeles. California claimed 113,255 Sub Africans in 2000. They came from Ethiopia, Nigeria, and South Africa. There is also a sizable Jamaican, Haitian, Caribbean, Afro-Latino, and Afro-Belizean population in California. There is also a small Bahamian, Barbadian, Bermudan, British West Indian, Dutch West Indian, and Trinidadian population in California. 

The earliest black residents in California were Afro-Latino slaves brought by the Spanish. African Americans migrated from Southern states like Oklahoma, Louisiana, Arkansas, and Texas to California during the Second Great Migration.

The black population in California has been declining. Blacks having been leaving California and moving out of the state along with whites. Gentrification in California has caused many African Americans in California to become homeless and has pushed them out of historical urban centers like Oakland, San Francisco and Los Angeles, and into new cheaper suburban regions, like East Contra Costa, Inland Empire and Central Valley. For example, many blacks from Los Angeles have moved to desert areas such as Palmdale and Lancaster in the 1990s. The black population in Los Angeles County has been rapidly declining. The black population has also declined in San Francisco. African Americans have the second highest poverty rate in California, after Hispanics. This has caused many blacks from California to move back to the Southern United States.

The black population has decreased in many neighborhoods and cities in California. Many areas such as Compton, Inglewood, and Watts that were once predominately black are now predominately Latino. Many Mexicans and Central Americans have displaced them in their historical areas. In 2019, African Americans were more likely to become homeless in California.

History

18th-century 

People of African descent first appeared in California from Mexico due to the Spanish Conquest. Spanish soldiers, priests, and settlers brought black slaves and free blacks into the state in the 18th-century. The settlers and escort soldiers who founded the towns of San José de Guadalupe (San Jose), Yerba Buena (San Francisco), Monterey, San Diego, and La Reina de Los Ángeles (Los Angeles) were primarily mestizo and of mixed Negro and Native American ancestry from the province of Sonora y Sinaloa in Mexico. There were also many mulattoes (part black, part Spanish) in Alta California.

19th-century 
Influential people of African ancestry were among the earliest California settlers and landowners. Pío Pico was a Californio politician, ranchero, and entrepreneur of mixed race with African ancestry, he had served as the last governor of Alta California under Mexican rule (from 1845 until 1846). Juana Briones de Miranda was a Californio business woman of mixed race with African ancestry, she is considered the "Founding Mother of San Francisco", as an early settler of Yerba Buena (now San Francisco). William Leidesdorff was black and multi-racial, he was one another founder of San Francisco.

After the discovery of gold in California on January 24, 1848, African Americans in search of wealth, and freedom arrived in the state during the California Gold Rush seeking their own gold discoveries. Additionally white Southerners brought black slaves into the California mines starting in 1849, and were primarily migrating from Texas, Mississippi, Missouri, and Arkansas. The Sweet Vengeance Mine was a gold mine in Browns Valley, discovered by African American miners during the Gold Rush. Moses Rodgers was considered one of the best miners in the state. 

Some of the oldest African American churches in California are the Saint Andrews African Methodist Episcopal Church of Sacramento (founded in 1850, formerly known as Bethel African Methodist Episcopal Church), the Third Baptist Church in San Francisco (founded in 1852), Bethel African Methodist Episcopal Church (Bethel AME Church) in San Francisco (founded in 1852), African Methodist Episcopal Zion Church (AME Zion Church) in San Francisco (founded in 1852), and the First African Methodist Episcopal Church of Los Angeles (founded in 1872). In the 1870s, Rev. Peter William Cassey helped form two new Black Episcopalian churches in San Francisco; "Christ's Mission Church" (or Christ Mission Church), and he worked closely with the congregation from what later became St. Cyprian’s Church, however neither group had a building at that time.

Many of the earliest African Americans in the state held the California State Convention of Colored Citizens, a series of colored convention events active from 1855 to 1902. At the conventions they had elected delegates from the various counties and would discuss topics like slavery, public education, and voting rights. 

Archy Lee had been formerly enslaved African-American and he was part of a series of notable 19th-century court cases that helped defined civil rights in the state by 1858. Edward Duplex was the first Black mayor in California, elected to office in Wheatland in 1888.

The first census recorded of African Americans in California appeared in 1850 with 962 people, and in 1860 with 4,086 people. Then, in 1910 the number rose to 22,000.

20th-century 

In the 1920s during the end of the Barbary Coast-era, Terrific Street was an entertainment district in San Francisco and it was home to numerous black and tan clubs (interracial clubs that often highlighted African American culture).

African Americans migrated during the Second Great Migration from the Southern United States (places like Arkansas, Louisiana, Oklahoma and Texas) to the Northeast, Midwest and West to escape Jim Crow laws, between 1940 and 1970. They also migrated to the state for better job opportunities, with many working in the defense industry and shipyards in California. Of the Black Louisianans who migrated to California, a number were Louisiana Creoles.

Before World War II, African Americans totaled to less than one percent of California's population. The California population of African Americans grew slowly, alongside other minorities, with only 21,645 African American residents in 1910 compared to 2 million white residents. Post-World War II, African Americans boosted their population enormously in California. 

Between the late-1940s until the early-1960s in San Francisco and Los Angeles, a new style of jazz was developed primarily by African Americans called West Coast jazz.

Your Black Muslim Bakery was a chain of bakeries opened by Yusuf Bey in 1968 in Santa Barbara, and moved headquarters in 1971 to Oakland; it had been a model of African American economic self-sufficiency but was later linked to physical and sexual abuse, welfare fraud, and murder which forced it's closure on August 9, 2007.

In 1991, Rodney King, an African American, was the victim of police brutality when he was beaten by three Los Angeles Police Department (LAPD) officers during his arrest. The Rodney King beating was caught on videotape, and after the police acquittal verdict the event was followed by the 1992 Los Angeles riots. After the 1992 riots some 50 people were murdered, an estimated 2,000 people were injured and 8,000 people were arrested.

Affirmative action is a set of laws, policies, guidelines, and administrative practices "intended to end and correct the effects of a specific form of discrimination". In November 1996, Affirmative Action was abolished through Proposition 209 by California lawmakers.

21st-century 

In the 2010s, California was a net loser of black migration for the first time in three decades. Most exiting California blacks are returning to Texas and the Atlanta metropolitan area. In 2018, there are Black neighborhoods and cities with Black populations surpassing 15% in Southern California like in Compton, South Los Angeles and Inglewood, and in Northern California like Stockton, Oakland, and Vallejo. Oakland has been noted for being a center of Northern California's black population, with it being at least 25% black as of 2020. Many African Americans who settled in California, likewise in Oakland, worked on the railroad in Oakland and East Bay areas in the early-to-mid 1900s.

In 2020, anti-black hate crimes in California has increased. In 2020–2022, the COVID-19 deaths rose for African Americans in California, which had the lowest vaccination rates in the state.

Media 

The first African American newspaper in California is thought to be the Mirror of the Times, published in the mid-1850s.

African American residents of California were first mentioned in 1919 by Black Californian historian Delilah Beasley, and later on Rudolph Lapp, others. More information appeared in journals such as The Journal of Negro history and The Journal of African American History. (3) Other Californian publications about African Americans include the California Eagle, California Voice, and Los Angeles Sentinel.

The largest film festival focused on black filmmaking is the Pan African Film Festival, founded in 1992. Other notable film festivals dedicated to enhancing the careers of Black filmmaking professionals include The San Diego Black Film Festival and the Hollywood Black Film Festival.

Education 

Elizabeth Thorn Scott Flood was an early African American educator in Sacramento starting in 1854, and she later taught in Oakland.

The Phoenixonian Institute of San Jose was the first high school for African American students in the state, it opened in 1861 as a private boarding school and closed in the mid-1870s when the state public schools were no longer segregated. The funding and support for the Phoenixonian Institute initially came from the California State Convention of Colored Citizens and the African American community on the West Coast.

In 1874, the California Supreme Court established the notion of "separate but equal" schools in Ward v. Flood. African American students in lower education increased from 24 pupils in 1870, to 183 pupils by the late 19th-century; and they ranked the highest performing students in literacy subjects in 1900. 

The first university Black studies department in the United States was created at San Francisco State University, following the Third World Liberation Front strikes of 1968.

In 1994, California's African American students made up about seven percent of higher education, compared to nine percent in the country.

Health 
Blacks in California have the highest death rate. Black Californians have the highest death rates from breast, cervical, colorectal, lung, and prostate cancer. In 2022, Blacks in California have died at a higher rate than other ethnic groups in from COVID-19 and had the lowest COVID-19 vaccination rates.

Politics 
82% of African Americans in California voted for Joe Biden in a exit poll in 2020. 82% of African American voters are registered as Democrats. 88% of African Americans in California voted for Hillary Clinton in 2016.

Kamala Harris is the first African American female Vice President, and she was born and raised in California.

Demographics

Notable Black Californians

See also

 :Category:African Americans in California
 African Americans in San Francisco
 History of the African Americans in Los Angeles
 California locations by race
 Demographics of California
 Afro-Mexicans
 Spanish California
 Hispanics and Latinos in California
 Blaxican
 Black Southerners
 African Americans in Texas
 African Americans in Georgia
 African Americans in Oklahoma
 African Americans in Louisiana
 Indigenous peoples of California
 White Americans in California
 Little Ethiopia
 Asian Americans in California
History of California
Mexicans in California
African Americans in Oregon
Jamaicans in California
Ethiopians in California
Eritreans in California
Nigerian Americans
Jews in California
South African Americans
West Indian Americans
African immigration to the United States
Louisiana Creoles

References

External links
 African American History in Mexican California
 Black-Latino tensions on rise in California
 Hispanics: California's Next Majority, The New York Times
https://www.nps.gov/juba/learn/historyculture/afro-latinos.htm
 https://hyperallergic.com/494309/california-bound-california-african-american-museum/
 https://theconversation.com/the-little-known-story-of-how-slavery-infiltrated-california-and-the-american-west-165705
 California Once Tried to Ban Black People
The hidden toll of California’s Black exodus
https://books.google.com/books?id=To13wGCf-9UC&q=african+americans+in+california&dq=african+americans+in+california&hl=en&sa=X&ved=2ahUKEwif9tnGtp35AhURvpQKHWLCBpIQ6AF6BAgLEAM
Black and Brown in Los Angeles: Beyond Conflict and Coalition
LATINO GANG MEMBERS IN SOUTHERN CALIFORNIA ARE TERRORIZING AND KILLING BLACKS
 https://calisphere.org/exhibitions/t8/california-cultures-african-americans/
 Racial/Ethnic Differences in Who’s Leaving California
 
 

 
People from California